Snezhnogorsk Airport  is an airfield in Russia located 5 km west of Snezhnogorsk. It is a small paved, fully engineered airfield with one or two buildings and a few narrow taxiways.

References
RussianAirFields.com

Airports built in the Soviet Union
Airports in Krasnoyarsk Krai